Final Curtain may refer to:

 Final Curtain (film), a 1957 television pilot written and directed by Ed Wood.
 Final Curtain (novel), a 1947 novel by Ngaio Marsh.
 "The Final Curtain" (The Green Green Grass), a 2007 episode of the BBC sitcom, The Green Green Grass.
 The Final Curtain (film), a 2002 British film directed by Patrick Harkins.
 The Final Curtain, a 2007 compilation album and DVD by Pompano Beach.
 "Final Curtain" (The Spectacular Spider-Man), the series finale of the 2008-09 animated series, The Spectacular Spider-Man.